Clauson-Marshall Racing is an American professional open-wheel racing team that currently competes in the IndyCar Series and the USAC Series.  With Pippa Mann driving, they qualified for the 2019 Indianapolis 500.  They are named in honor of Bryan Clauson.

Racing results

IndyCar Series

(key)

References

External links

Clauson-Marshall Racing Facebook Page
Clauson-Marshall Racing Twitter Page

IndyCar Series teams
American auto racing teams